Barrio Norte may refer to:

Barrio Norte, Buenos Aires
Barrio Norte, Panama